Allen is an unincorporated community in Natchitoches Parish, Louisiana, United States. It is located approximately 11 miles northwest of Natchitoches near the intersection of Interstate 49 (exit 148) and Louisiana Highway 485.

The community is part of the Natchitoches Micropolitan Statistical Area.

External links

Unincorporated communities in Natchitoches Parish, Louisiana
Unincorporated communities in Louisiana
Populated places in Ark-La-Tex